ZAZ was a Mexican cable television network owned by MVS Comunicaciones aimed at children and teenagers. The cable network was launched in Mexico in October 1991 and expanded to the rest of Latin America in 1996. In Mexico and Latin America it was available through various cable television companies. Originally its programming consisted of "non-violent" animated and live-action series, though on its final years the channel's concept was changed, airing anime series and family movies.

Due to low ratings and gradual loss of programming, the channel ceased operations on July 31, 2012, with no official replacement (many cable systems that carried ZAZ replaced it with music-oriented channel Exa TV, also owned by MVS).

History
ZAZ launched in 1991 as the third children's cable channel in Latin America after Cablin and The Big Channel in Argentina. It was only seen in Mexico through the MMDS MVS Multivisión platform. At launch, ZAZ broadcast children's programming, primarily cartoons, of American, Canadian, French and English origin, both classic and contemporary. ZAZ was initially noted for broadcasting series from the Fox Kids Network; a year later it would also air programs from Nickelodeon and CINAR. ZAZ also began airing adult/family-skewing sitcoms, dramas, and movies from 8:00PM to 6:00AM, primarily sourced from Warner Bros. In 1993, Fox Kids programming moved to the new Latin American FOX channel, so ZAZ continued to air Nickelodeon programming and obtained programs from Nelvana, Alliance and DIC Entertainment.

ZAZ lost Nickelodeon programs in 1996 due to the launch of Nickelodeon in Latin America, but compensated for the loss with acquired series from various production companies from around the world and Latin America. One of its most successful programs during the second half of the 1990s was the English video game program Cybernet, originally called Gameswatch, which continued to air until March 2011 although in some periods, it moved to the MAS channel, also from MVS Multivision.

In 1996, ZAZ launched on DirecTV, expanding to all of Latin America; ZAZ also began calling itself a non-violent channel.

In August 2003, the channel changed its name to ZAZ Moviepark and focused more on family movies and less series, which occupied a small space. The magazine Selecciones del Reader's Digest had its own sponsored movie segment, Al Cine Con Selecciones where films of different types were also broadcast, including some independent productions.

On April 7, 2008, after several years without presenting new programs, ZAZ began a renewal of the channel with the premiere of Argentina telenovela Rebelde Way and changing its name back to ZAZ, while changing its target audience to tweens. That same year, due to the launch of the Dish México system by MVS and Telmex, which caused a new "war" of pay TV services with Televisa, SKY, Cablevisión} and Cablemás, they withdrew MVS Televisión's channels including ZAZ.

On January 4, 2009, the target audience change became official with the premiere of anime series Kiba and Eyeshield 21, joined by Deltora Quest, Yu-Gi-Oh! 5D's, Idaten Jump, Huntik, Rollbots and Ryukendo. On July 31, 2009, ZAZ and Multipremier were removed from DirecTV Latin America due to exclusive contracts with Claro TV.

In February 2010, ZAZ rebranded again, adopting new promotional material and a new slogan: ZAZ, más cool, como tú. That same year, the anime series Inazuma Eleven and Kenichi debuted. In the final days of the 2010 FIFA World Cup, ZAZ premiered the first two episodes of Inazuma Eleven'''s third season. In August, Ryukendo aired daily twice a day while Kiba was removed to air two consecutive episodes of Kenichi. On August 23, ZAZ premiered ZAZ Sensei, a news program broadcast between commercial breaks where the world of anime, news, conventions and related things of interest to young audiences are discussed. The series stopped airing in mid-2011. On September 25, Rebelde Way was removed and on September 27, Lalala! premiered, the channel's first musical program including interviews with artists and tips on being a good musician.

In 2011, Cybernet was withdrawn because the company that produced Cybernet in the UK canceled the program. Also in March Yu-Gi-Oh! 5D's and Huntik were removed. In October the first 52 episodes of Eyeshield 21 returned in continuous four-episode blocks replacing the two-episode block of Deltora Quest. ZAZ aired the movie Spider-Man in December.

In January 2012, Eyeshield 21, Ryukendo, Idaten Jump and Kenichi were removed, and in February 2012, Ryukendo returned while Deltora Quest was removed. In early May 2012, Rollbots was removed from the schedule.

End of broadcasts
Due to low audience ratings and the gradual loss of programming, as well as being withdrawn from many pay TV systems both in Mexico and in the rest of Latin America, the channel was withdrawn from the air on July 31, 2012. Ryukendo was its last broadcast program, followed by the music video for Tears Dry on Their Own'' by Amy Winehouse. At 12:00AM on August 1, 2012 only the MVS Television logo was shown, ending more than 20 years of broadcasting in Mexico (16 in Latin America). Many cable systems replaced ZAZ with Exa TV or another channel.

External links
ZAZ official website

References

Television networks in Mexico
MVS Comunicaciones
Spanish-language television stations
Children's television networks
Television channels and stations established in 1991
Television channels and stations disestablished in 2012
1991 establishments in Mexico
2012 disestablishments in Mexico